The 2002 Rutgers Scarlet Knights football team represented Rutgers University in the 2002 NCAA Division I-A football season. The Scarlet Knights were led by second-year head coach Greg Schiano and played their home games at Rutgers Stadium. They are a member of the Big East Conference. They finished the season 1–11, 0–7 in Big East play to finish in last place.

Schedule

Roster

Team players in the NFL

References

Rutgers
Rutgers Scarlet Knights football seasons
Rutgers Scarlet Knights football